Brazo Largo is a village in the municipality of Villa Paranacito in the Islas del Ibicuy department in Entre Ríos Province in north-eastern Argentina. There is a railway station some 8 km west of the village, along the General Urquiza Railway.

References

Populated places in Entre Ríos Province